is a Mahjong video game developed by Nintendo and Mediakite and published by Nintendo for the Nintendo DS. It is a successor to Nintendo's 1989 Game Boy game Yakuman. It features modern Japanese Mahjong rules (with riichi and dora) and various characters from the Mario video game series.

The original version was released in Japan in March 2005 by Nintendo. In September of the following year they re-released the game with an online mode and the revised title . Both versions were released only in Japan and with predominantly Japanese text.

In Japanese Mahjong, the term yakuman can refer both to the rare high-scoring limit hands and to the largest score limit that can be applied to a winning hand under Japanese Mahjong scoring rules.

Game modes
Free Play mode- In Free Play mode the player can freely choose opponents, rules and options.
Challenge mode- Win by fulfilling a given set of conditions with a given set of opponents. Initially easy, normal and hard "courses" are available. Completing these unlocks characters and an expert course.
Ranking mode- The character chosen starts at rank 20. The player plays against the other characters to ascend and possibly become rank 1 (the top three opponents are Petey Piranha, Bowser, and Toadsworth in ascending order). Note that the ranking system works by winning points from beating other players; thus the top opponents do not need to be unlocked in order to ascend above them.
Local multiplayer- A game for multiple players (up to four), all within range of the DS wireless radio.
Online multiplayer (2006 edition only) – Like online multiplayer for other DS games, with the same Friend Code system. Voice chat is available.

Reception

Sales
The game sold poorly at less than 40.000 copies across both versions.

Notes

References

The initial version of this article was based on the article Yakuman DS from the external wiki Super Mario Wiki, released under the GFDL by its authors.

External links
Official website (In Japanese)

2005 video games
Mahjong video games
Japan-exclusive video games
Nintendo DS games
Nintendo DS-only games
Nintendo games
Puzzle video games
Video games developed in Japan